Arhopala hellenore, Doherty's green oakblue, is a species of butterfly belonging to the lycaenid family described by William Doherty in 1889. It is found in  Southeast Asia - Assam, Manipur, Burma, Mergui, Thailand, Indo China, Hainan (A. h. hellenore) Sumatra, Peninsular Malaya (A. h. siroes Fruhstorfer, 1914).

Subspecies
Arhopala hellenore hellenore (Assam, Manipur, Burma, Mergui, Thailand, Indo China, Hainan)
Arhopala hellenore siroes Fruhstorfer, 1914 (Sumatra, Peninsular Malaysia)

References

External links
"Arhopala Boisduval, 1832" at Markku Savela's Lepidoptera and Some Other Life Forms

Arhopala
Butterflies described in 1889
Butterflies of Asia
Taxa named by William Doherty